Jean Puget de la Serre (15 November 1594 – July 1665) was a French author and dramatist.

Puget de la Serre was born in Toulouse in late 1594. He was the author of more than a hundred works. He further authored several ballets which were performed in Brussels where he was part of the court of the exiled French Queen Mother, Marie de Medicis, between 1628 and 1635. He also wrote a number of plays.

Puget de la Serre returned to France some time before the death of Marie de Medicis, in 1639 at the latest, and was fortunate enough to be received favourably by King Louis XIII of France and the Cardinal de Richelieu, who granted him a pension of 2000 écus. Puget may have owed his good fortune to the influence of his cousin, Pierre Puget de Montauron, a leading financier of the day.

He was appointed librarian in the household of Gaston, Duke of Orléans and in 1647 became almoner to Gaston's daughter, Anne Marie Louise d'Orléans (usually known as la Grande Mademoiselle). He died at Paris in 1665.

Selected works 

 Le Roman de la cour de Bruxelles, Spa and Aachen, 1628
 Le Tombeau des delices du monde, Brussels, 1630
 Le Bréviaire des courtisans, Brussels, 1631
 Le Miroir qui ne flatte point, 1632 (translated as The Mirrour Which Flatters Not, London, 1639)
 Dutch edition: De Spiegel, die niet vleyd : Handelende Van de verachting der Werelt, en van de bedenkingen des Doots. van Goedesberg, Amsterdam 1667. (digital)
 Le Balet des Princes indiens, Brussels, 1634
 Mausolee erigé à la memoire d'Isabelle-Claire-Eugenie (Brussels: Jean Pepermans, 1634) Available on Google Books
 Histoire de l’entree de la reyne mere du roy tres-Chrestien, dans la Grande-Bretaigne, 1639
 Het Graf der Wereltse Vermakingen. van Goedesberg, Amsterdam 1666 (digital)
 Gedachteniße, Der Eeuwigheydt : Tot af-stervinge van des werelds ydel-heyt en verderflijkheyt ; Allen staten van menschen zeer dienstelik ; Vermeerdert met ses aandachtige Aanmerkingen ; Vertoomende waar toe de Gedachtenisse der Eeuwigheit den menschen dienen kan. van Goedesberg, Amsterdam 1667 (digital)

Notes

References 
 Works by Puget de la Serre at CÉSAR
 
 Meyer, Véronique (2000) "Un auteur du XVIIe siècle et l’illustration de ses livres" in Bibliothèque de l'école des chartes, volume 158, number 1, available at Persée

17th-century French male writers
17th-century French dramatists and playwrights
French ballet librettists
Historiographers
1594 births
Writers from Toulouse
1665 deaths